The first USS Shreveport (PG-131/PF-23) was a  of the United States Navy.

She was laid down under Maritime Commission contract (MC hull 1434) on 8 March 1943 by Walter Butler Shipbuilders, Inc., in Superior, Wisconsin; reclassified PF-23 on 15 April 1943; launched on 15 July 1943, sponsored by Miss Nell Querbes; and commissioned on 24 April 1944 at Algiers, Louisiana.

Service history
Following shakedown off Bermuda, Shreveport arrived at Boston, Massachusetts, on 9 November 1944.  Conversion to a weather ship followed (the after 3-inch gun was removed and a weather balloon hangar was added); and on 2 March 1945, she departed Boston and headed north to assume weather reporting and aircraft lifeguard duties in the North Atlantic.

Operating on stations between Newfoundland and Iceland, she completed her North Atlantic service in the fall and moved south, to Recife, Brazil, whence she conducted similar patrols from December 1945 until March 1946.  She sailed for the United States on 8 March; was transferred to the operational control of the Coast Guard while en route; arrived at Boston on the 23rd; then, steamed to Charleston, South Carolina, for inactivation.

Shreveport was decommissioned on 9 May 1946; struck from the Navy list on 10 June; and sold for scrapping to the Sun Shipbuilding and Drydock Company, Chester, Pennsylvania, in September 1947.

References

 
 

Tacoma-class frigates
World War II patrol vessels of the United States
Shreveport, Louisiana
Ships built in Superior, Wisconsin
1943 ships
Weather ships